Sweet Defeat is the second studio album by British singer/songwriter and musician Jon Allen, released on 31 May 2011 on the label Monologue Records in the UK.

Track listing

Charts

References

2011 albums
Jon Allen (musician) albums